The Whimsical Stakes is a thoroughbred horse race run annually in mid April at Woodbine Racetrack in Toronto, Ontario, Canada. A Grade III race since 2006, it is open to  fillies and mares aged four and older. It is raced over a distance of 6 furlongs on Tapeta synthetic dirt and currently carries a purse of $115,500.

Since its inception in 1956 at Toronto's Greenwood Raceway, the race has been contested at various distances:
 6 furlongs : 1956 at Greenwood Raceway, 1975 at Fort Erie Racetrack, 1976–1979, and since 1986 at Woodbine Racetrack
  furlongs : 1957 at Greenwood Raceway, 1968-1974 at Fort Erie Racetrack
 7 furlongs : 1958-1960, 1980-1985 at Greenwood Raceway
 1 mile : 1961-1966 at Greenwood Raceway
 1 mile : 1967 on turf at Fort Erie Racetrack

The race was run in two divisions in 1981 and 1984.

Records
Speed  record: (at current distance of 6 furlongs)
 1:08.88 - Leigh Court (2016)

Most wins:
 3 - Prospective Dolly (1991, 1993, 1994)

Most wins by an owner:
 3 - Estate of  M. Rich & N. Clements (1991, 1993, 1994)
 3 - Larkin Maloney & Conn Smythe (1958, 1959, 1960)
 3 - Stafford Farm (1966, 1976, 1979)

Most wins by a jockey:
 6 - Dave Penna (1984, 1987, 1988, 1991, 1993, 1994)

Most wins by a trainer:
 4 - Jerry C. Meyer (1956, 1962, 1963, 1964)
 4 - Yonnie Starr (1958, 1959, 1960, 1981)
 4 - Tony Mattine (1986, 1991, 1993, 1994)

Winners of the Whimsical Stakes

See also
 List of Canadian flat horse races

References

Graded stakes races in Canada
Flat horse races for four-year-old fillies
Sprint category horse races for fillies and mares
Recurring sporting events established in 1956
Woodbine Racetrack
Fort Erie Race Track